Javier Aguirre Fernández (13 June 1935 – 4 December 2019) was a Spanish film director, writer and producer.

Biography and career

Aguirre was born in Donostia-San Sebastián in Spain. Aguirre developed an interest in film at an early age. When he was a teenager, he started collaborating for entertainment magazines like Radiocinema, Film Ideal, and others. In 1955, when he was around 20 years old, he founded and directed the San Sebastián Film Club. From 1956 to 1957, Aguirre organized film courses and film festivals. During those years, he also studied at the Instituto de Investigaciones y Experiencias Cinematográficas (IIEC). He worked as an assistant director until he started directing his own short films in the 1960s.

He started his work as a director in 1961, directing a documentary short titled Pasajes tres, which received the Golden Shell at the San Sebastián International Film Festival. He 
had a prolific career, directing 45 feature films, 10 short films, 2 documentaries, and 25 documentary shorts. Aguirre also wrote and produced most of his films.

Spanish horror movie fans know him as the director of three popular Paul Naschy horror films, El jorobado de la Morgue (1973, aka Hunchback of the Morgue),  El gran amor del conde Drácula (1973, aka Count Dracula's Great Love) and El asesino esta entre los trece (aka The Killer is One of the Thirteen).

Personal life 

Aguirre was married to actress Enriqueta Carballeira from 1966 to 1977. The couple had a daughter, Arantxa Aguirre, who also works as a director. Javier was married to actress Esperanza Roy when he died.

Death 
Aguirre died on 4 December 2019 in a Madrid hospital after a long illness. He was still married to actress Esperanza Roy at the time of his death.

Filmography

 Los oficios de Cándido (1965)
 Los chicos con las chicas (1967)
 Los que tocan el piano (1968)
 Una vez al año ser hippy no hace daño (1969)
 Soltera y madre en la vida (1969)
 De profesión, sus labores (1970)
 El astronauta (1970)
 Pierna creciente, falda menguante (1970)
 Soltero y padre en la vida (1972)
 El jorobado de la Morgue (1973) aka The Hunchback of the Morgue
 El gran amor del conde Drácula (1973) aka Count Dracula's Great Love
 Volveré a nacer (1973)
 El insólito embarazo de los Martínez (1974)
 Vida íntima de un seductor cínico (1975)
 El mejor regalo (1975)
 El asesino está entre los trece (1976) aka The Killer is One of the Thirteen
 Ligeramente viudas (1976)
 La iniciación en el amor (1976)
 Acto de posesión (1977)
 Esposa de día, amante de noche (1977)
 Carne apaleada (1977)
 Rocky Carambola (1979)
 El consenso (1980)
 La guerra de los niños (1980)
 Los pecados de mamá (1980)
 Cariñosamente infiel (1981)
 La segunda guerra de los niños (1981)
 Vida/Perra (1982)
 En busca del huevo perdido (1982)
 Las locuras de Parchís (1982)
 Martes y trece, ni te cases ni te embarques (1982)
 Los pajaritos (1983)
 Parchís entra en acción (1983)
 La monja alférez (1987)
 El polizón de Ulises (1987)
 La diputada (1988)
 El amor si tiene cura (1991)
 Continuum (1994)
 Voz (2000)
 Zero/infinito (2002)
 Variaciones 1/113 (2003)
 Medea 2 (2006)
 Dispersión de la luz (2006)
 Sol (2009, Documentary)

References

External links
 
Javier Aguirre on the Experimental Cinema Wiki

1935 births
2019 deaths
Film directors from the Basque Country (autonomous community)
Spanish film directors
Spanish male screenwriters
Spanish film producers
People from San Sebastián